The 1988 Currie Cup Division B (known as the Santam Bank Currie Cup for sponsorship reasons) was the second division of the Currie Cup competition, the 49th season in the since it started in 1889.

Teams

Competition

Regular season and title play-offs
There were six participating teams in the 1988 Currie Cup Division B. These teams played each other twice over the course of the season, once at home and once away. Teams received two points for a win and one points for a draw. The top two teams qualified for the Division B finals, played at the home venue of the higher-placed team.

The winner of the final also qualified for the 1988 Currie Cup Semi-Final.

Promotion play-offs
The top team on the log qualified for the promotion play-offs. That team played off against the team placed seventh in Division A over two legs. The winner over these two ties qualified for the 1989 Currie Cup Division A, while the losing team qualified for the 1989 Currie Cup Division B.

Relegation play-offs
The bottom team on the log qualified for the relegation play-offs. That team played off against the team that won the Santam Bank Trophy Division A over two legs. The winner over these two ties qualified for the 1989 Currie Cup Division B, while the losing team qualified for the 1989 Santam Bank Trophy Division A.

Log

Fixtures and Results

Round One

Round Two

Round Three

Round Four

Round Five

Round Six

Round Seven

Round Eight

Round Nine

Round Ten

Round Eleven

Round Twelve

Final

Currie Cup Semi-Final
As champions of Division B,  qualified to the semi-finals of the main Currie Cup competition, where they met Division A runners-up .

Promotion/relegation play-offs

Promotion play-offs
In the promotion play-offs,  beat  on aggregate and won promotion to Division A.  were initially relegated, but Division A was expanded to 8 teams and they retained their place.

Relegation play-offs
In the relegation play-offs,  beat  on aggregate and won promotion to the 1989 Currie Cup Division B.  were initially relegated to the 1989 Santam Bank Trophy Division A, but due to the Currie Cup Division A's subsequent expansion to 8 teams, they retained their place.

See also
 1988 Currie Cup Division A
 1988 Santam Bank Trophy Division A
 1988 Santam Bank Trophy Division B
 1988 Lion Cup

References

B
1988